Dunsany may refer to:

 Dunsany Castle and Demesne, County Meath, Ireland
 Baron of Dunsany, "Lord Dunsany" or "Dunsany", the holders of the Dunsany estate
 Dunsany, County Meath, a townland and hamlet, named for the adjacent castle and demesne
 Christopher Plunkett, 1st Baron of Dunsany (1410–1463), Irish peer
 Edward Plunkett, 18th Baron of Dunsany, the writer and playwright "Lord Dunsany"
 Dunsany's Chess, an asymmetric variant of chess created by Lord Dunsany
 Horace Plunkett, first head of the Department of Agriculture in Ireland and the pioneer of the cooperative movement there
 Randal Plunkett, 21st Baron of Dunsany, rewilding advocate and film director